Phryganopsis interstiteola is a moth in the subfamily Arctiinae. It was described by George Hampson in 1914. It is found in South Africa.

References

Endemic moths of South Africa
Moths described in 1914
Lithosiini